Raymond L. (Ray) Ison (born 3 July 1952, Bathurst, NSW, Australia) is an Australian-British cybernetician, systems scholar/scientist, and Professor of Systems at the Open University in the UK. He is currently President of the International Federation for Systems Research (IFSR). He was also Professor Systems for Sustainability at Monash University, and fellow at the Centre for Policy Development, and President of the International Society for the Systems Sciences in the year 2014-15. He is known for his work on systems praxeology within rural development, sustainable management, systemic governance and the design and enactment of learning systems.

David Russell, a psychotherapist and psychodynamic psychologist in private practice in Sydney and Blackheath, NSW, Australia, about Ray Ison: "All of Ison's professional work has been driven by a passion to maintain a flourishing and highly interactive life-world. His writings and research have given voice to this passion by consistently exemplifying an epistemology of action: How we know what we know; how this knowledge shapes ongoing experience; and how this experience is found to be satisfying or dissatisfying. His approach has been to focus on relationships and the networks in which they are embedded, namely, the systems."

Awards 

Foundation Medal, Wesley College (University of Sydney); Academician of IASCYS (International Academy of Systems and Cybernetic Sciences)

Life and work 

From a background in Agricultural Science (University of Sydney) including plant ecophysiology and agronomy (University of Queensland) and systems agriculture, rural development and agricultural extension (Hawkesbury & University of Sydney) Ison has established himself as a major scholar and practitioner in the field of Systems Praxeology – the science of practical action grounded in systems thinking in practice (STiP). 

Ison's research and scholarship spans the biophysical and social and is primarily interdisciplinary and collaborative. He has made major contributions to systemic governance, particularly in the fields of water and river catchments based on social learning realised through STiP. Many of his publications can be seen or accessed by Open Research Online.

Ison, who took up the Chair in Systems at The Open University (UK) in 1994, is only the third appointee to the Open University (OU) chair in Systems since the group was established in 1971 (the inaugural chair was John Beishon, followed by Derek Pugh). From 2008-15 he was also Professor Systems for Sustainability at Monash University (School of Geography and the Monash Sustainability Institute) where he established and ran the Systemic Governance Research Program which now continues within the Applied Systems Thinking in Practice (ASTiP) group at the OU.

Ison has been returned in all UK Research Assessment Exercises (now Research Excellence Framework or REF) with the OU Development Studies group (there is no category for Systems). In 2021 this will be Unit of Assessment 22, Anthropology and Development Studies. 

Building on his academic achievements Ison has gone on to hold major leadership roles within the international Systems and Cybernetics community. He is currently President of the International Federation for Systems Research (IFSR).

Early career - Australia-based 1982-1994 

Ison began his academic career as a Lecturer at the University of Western Sydney in 1982. From 1982-86 he was part of the internationally famed 'Hawkesbury Experiment' to co-develop with students a novel 'learning system' graduating Systems Agriculturalists based on capabilities to think and act systemically, to take responsibility for their own learning and to be effective communicators in processes of transformative change. Originally inspired by Richard Bawden, the Hawkesbury 'experiment' ran for 20 years and influenced agricultural education internationally.2 Whilst at Hawkesbury Ison led local organisation of the international conference 'Agricultural Systems Research' 3 as well as becoming Director of Farming Systems overseeing the College's multi-enterprise farming operation also used as a basis for experiential learning by students. In the latter role Ison embarked upon the situated, collaborative, reflexive, systemic praxis that has been central to his career. His exploration of purpose in relation to field-crop ecosystems with Richard Bawden4 and his co-authored paper: Soft-systems methodology for action research:  The role of a college farm in an agricultural education institution exemplify his systemic research praxis at this time.5

Ison was a pioneer in seeking and gaining funding for 'action research' projects6 within the agricultural sector in Australia. The Australian Seed Industry Study (with W. Potts) was funded in 1985 by the then Rural Industries Research & Development Corporation.7 The report was an exemplar of how to understand an industry holistically and to draw attention to systemic failures in organisation and structure.

In 1986 Ison moved to the University of Sydney, where he was appointed Senior Lecturer in the School of Crop Sciences. From 1986-94 he created and braided two research programs. 

1. Second-order	R&D rather than 'Knowledge transfer'

In a long and fruitful collaboration with David Russell (formerly UWS, now WSU)8 beginning in 1986 they have made a major contribution to elucidating the failings of the linear model of knowledge, or technology, transfer that dominates the mainstream innovation and agricultural extension paradigm, understandings and practices they characterised as 'first-order R&D'.9 This research was built on a critical review of 'agricultural extension' practices (subsequently translated into French and Persian).10 Co-researching with pastoralists, extension and research staff in the NSW Western Division in the CARR (Community Approaches to Rangeland Research) project (1990-94), Ison with Russell established how 'enthusiasm' (from the Greek meaning 'the god within') could be understood as theory, underlying emotion and methodology and how an R&D system could be designed based on 'common enthusiasms' rather than 'information transfer', the prevailing, yet inadequate 'first-order' paradigm.11 In making 'second-order R&D' doable they demonstrated how the limitations of the linear model could be overcome through conceptual, praxis and institutional innovation. In addition to elucidating how enthusiasm might operate as an underpinning conception for an R&D system12 their research:

 found that processes	that sought consensus, rather than accommodations through valuing	difference, undermined enthusiasm to act i.e., consensus is a lowest	common denominator position;
 enthusiasm could be	triggered or brought forth by providing the experience of being	listened to unconditionally or by cultivating the telling of	stories.13	This experience of working with narrative was later taken up and	refined by Ison with Paschen in climate change adaptation research	which challenged the mainstream approach to vulnerabilities	assessment)14
 developed tools and	methods for dialogic rather than debate-based communication in the	praxis of co-researching – including diffusing power relations by	researchers owning what they had experienced rather than telling	pastoralists 'how things were' 15	16	 
 elucidated how the	semi-arid rangelands (and institutionalised R&D) came to be	socially constructed as Europeans appropriated the landscape17	
 demonstrated how	artefactual technology as well as social technologies acted to	transform human experience and thus relationship with the	biophysical world18	
 showed how the	institutional arrangements of organised R&D undermined the	capacity for researchers to act with enthusiasm (a precursor to	Ison's later concern with systemic governing)19

The CARR research is reported in the edited book by Ison & Russell (2000/2007) based on contributions from research team members.20 Russell and Ison delivered an invited plenary talk based on this research at the IVth International Rangeland Congress in Montpellier in 1991.21

Both Russell and Ison were influenced by the 'biology of cognition' research and epistemology of Humberto Maturana.22 23 Ison first met Maturana in Melbourne in 1988. Subsequently, they have maintained collaborative conversations in the UK, Chile, Ecuador, Sardinia and at ASC events in the USA. Maturana's question: what do we do when we do what we do? has been a leitmotif in Ison's scholarship underpinning his contributions to systems praxeology. Consequently, Ison has become recognised internationally within the Systems community as a Maturana scholar;24 25 Pille Bunnell, also a Maturana scholar, has been a long-term collaborator.

In the early 1990s in two invited Keynote presentations Ison outlined the case for what he then called participative ecodesign.26 27 When asked to address 'changing community attitudes' by the Australian Rangeland Society he argued 

the case for participative ecodesign as a means of conducting future rangeland research and development. To embark on this path it will be necessary for the rangeland science community to critically question traditions and myths which shape current practices. These include current conceptions of extension, "technology transfer", community and human communication.  Research has shown that attitudes of rangeland decision-makers are rarely a constraint to dealing with issues of land degradation and management and technology "adoption". Attempts to change attitudes are likely to be of little value. 28 A recognition of the unequal power relations implicit in traditional practice is a necessary precondition to the emergence of participative processes which reverse the history of subjection of grazier knowledge and values by institutionalised authority. A set of values and guiding principles are proposed for participative ecodesign. These include (i) reinterpreting our relationship with land; (ii) policy development based on citizen as opposed to individual values and (iii) acknowledging power in the design process. 

In this work Ison foreshadowed the rise in interest in systemic design in the early 2000s and his own, later, concern with the responsibility of the systems practitioner to be able to take a 'design turn' in their praxis (outlined in his book Systems Practice. How to Act).

Ison also pioneered in Australian rural research the development of methods for interdisciplinary and citizen engagement in formulating research questions and projects adapted from Rapid and Participatory Appraisal (conceptualised as an antidote to 'development tourism'). His insight was to see development failure as operating as much in 'developed' countries as in 'developing countries'.29 30 These approaches were later adapted for application in organisations. For a period Rapid Organisational Appraisal was successfully incorporated into Open University staff induction practices by the HR Department (i.e. induction was no longer something done to you by the organisation, but a group-based inquiry carried out by inductees into the systemic nature of the organisation and used to co-design a learning experience for senior staff).31 

2. Grassland	systems and grassland eco-physiologyFollowing from his doctoral research32 Ison's subsequent plant eco-physiological research, mainly with PhD students, elucidated important agronomic and managerial factors associated with seed bank dynamics, seed dormancy mechanisms and nutritive characteristics for alleviating the autumn feed gap in the wheat-sheep zone of Australia.33 34

Within the grassland agronomy/agriculture academic and research community, and with increasing international attention, Ison pioneered, with co-researchers, approaches to understanding grasslands as both biological and human activity systems (as evidenced in the two editions of Agronomy of Grassland Systems co-authored with Craig Pearson). In the second edition (1997) Ison presented the case that 'grassland systems' should be framed 'as if' they were socially constructed systems where sustainability was an emergent property. 

His concerns for the centrality of 'learning' to change processes and the efficacy of Universities in enabling learning (which had been triggered at Hawkesbury) continued at the University of Sydney35 and braided his two strands of research until circumstances forced a choice. His work with the seed industry had demonstrated that progress through agronomic and biological research was secondary to matters within the social and organisational realm (though only minimally in the economic). Such a choice is common according to Don Schön who characterised it as the crisis of relevance or rigour, a decision to descend into the swamp of real-life issues or to continue to stand on the high ground of technical rationality. His IIED Gatekeeper publication 'Teaching Threatens Sustainable Agriculture' written at this time has been influential.

 Phase 1: UK-based 1995-2005 

Ison moved to the UK and the Open University (OU) at the end of 1994. During 1995 he undertook an inquiry into his new situation, producing a report called The OU from a Systems Perspective. In 1995 he became Head of the then Systems Department (1995-8; 2005-6 of 25 academic staff).  His 26 years at the OU can be understood in terms of two phases marked by geography but realising significant scholarship, development and application of STiP (systems thinking in practice) as a praxeology much needed in the time of the Anthropocene.36

1. Curriculum renewal and	organisational change with STiPFrom 1995 Ison led at the OU development of a new MSc becoming the first Director of the Environmental Decision Making (EDM) Program (now Environmental Management).37 In a pioneering move for the OU he, with Chris Blackmore, organised the purchase and adaptation of a University of London (Wye College) module on Environmental Ethics. In the core EDM course from 1997-2006, 1398 students registered and 1122 completed, an 80% completion rate. OU course development is an example of applied R&D and involves a synthesis of research and pedagogic scholarship.

From 1996 till 2005 Ison, in the conviction that STiP should be used in the day job, i.e. one should walk the talk, led, with OU colleagues a series of reforms including: 

 reorganisation	of the then Systems Department into the Centre for Complexity	and Change with three constituent disciplines: Systems, Development	Management and Technology Management; 
 a series of internal	change management programs (in collaboration with HR) to build	STiP capability in transitioning towards a 'learning	organisation'.  The most significant and effective program was	PERSYST a partnership project (though organised as a systemic	inquiry) of Personnel and Systems to enhance STiP capability. 38	39	 This program ran for 5 years and was led by Dr Rosalind Armson, a Senior Lecturer seconded from the Systems Department. Her book 'Growing Wings on the Way' draws on her experience.

In the period 1995-2005 there was significant renewal of undergraduate Systems Modules each requiring investment in excess of £250,000 per module and created by a module team of academics and educational technologists. Modules developed during that time included: Systems Thinking: Principles and Practice (T205); Managing Complexity. A Systems Approach (T306); Environmental Decision Making. A systems Approach (T860, T863); Environmental Ethics (T861) as well as the Information Systems PG program. Tens of thousands of mature age students have studied an OU Systems module in the last 50 years.40

2. Researching	and enacting 'learning systems'For Ison, teaching and research are not a dualism but a duality; they are practices mediated by STiP, especially systemic action research, systemic design and/or systemic inquiry or co-inquiry. These systems practices create new ways of being, knowing and doing through their enactment enabling social learning and situational transformations. Ison has an established record of achievement in the design of learning/inquiry systems in which stakeholders can take responsibility for situation-improving action and at the same time become aware of the constraints, especially institutional constraints, 41 to their capacity to be response-able.42 43 44 In the lineage of Dewey, Schön, Churchman, Bawden, Vickers and Checkland, Ison's research seeks to lay the groundwork for the emergence of 'learning systems' as an alternative to seeing 'knowledge transfer' as an 'end-of-pipe' process (see 45 46 47 48) and as a means to generate transformative change through social learning (see below).

Ison was a key contributor to the LEARN Group49 which came into being with support from the SAD Group within INRA. The concern and motivation of the group was to understand and develop learning-based approaches to change in agricultural and rural development settings. The co-edited book 'Cow up a Tree' was one outcome along with the EU-funded Learning project.50 The title for the book was a metaphor taken from a chance encounter by the LEARN group members with the sculpture by John Kelly, one of three in an edition that caused a sensation in the modern art world in 1999, featured at the "Champs de la Sculpture" exhibition on the Champs-Élysées in Paris.(v) Social learning as STiP and governance mechanism 

Conceptually, Ison's research has been mainly at the interface between the social and biophysical. Prior to 2000 he demonstrated that stakeholder participation was necessary and powerful when done well (in developed countries as much as developing) – but participation was not sufficient when the gains made from participatory practices were not institutionalised. Poor praxis also led to the phenomenon of 'being participated'.  Thus, Ison and colleagues turned their attention to researching 'social learning' built on a social theory of learning.51 They hypothesised social learning could be enabled within multi-stakeholder platforms that facilitated collaborative and transformational action.52 Their research hypothesis was supported in that transformations in understandings and practices towards concerted action (i.e. social learning) in a multi-stakeholder situation was possible when certain conditions were met – by attention to history (initial starting conditions), the presence of enabling (and absence of constraining) institutions, an active stakeholding in an issue, supported by attention to facilitation and to the epistemological/knowing ecology of those engaged. In the majority of their cases the presence of a formalised multi-stakeholder platform did not in itself lead to social learning. 

With colleagues (including Niels Röling, Chris Blackmore, Janice Jiggins, David Gibbon, Drennan Watson, Bernard Hubert, Patrick Steyaert, Kevin Collins, Neil Powell and Pier Paolo Roggero), Ison co-developed and led (as PI) the EU funded Fifth Framework project SLIM (Social learning for the integrated management and sustainable use of water at catchment scale). Together these 31 researchers from five countries elucidated through empirical, theoretical and systemic-design research how social learning could be employed as: 

 a praxis drawing upon STiP that enables	situational transformation (e.g. of a river catchment) due to	changes in understanding and practices of those stakeholders engaged	in producing concerted action, and 
 an alternative governance mechanism (to	normalising practices, regulating the market or raising	awareness/attempting behaviour change), for managing in complex	situations, particularly water catchments and other multiple	stakeholder settings.53	 

The main research outcomes are summarised in a special issue of the journal 'Environmental Science & Policy', the SLIM Final Report and a set of Policy Briefs.

The SLIM research group sought to apply and enact the project as a social learning system imbued with systems practices. It was largely successful acting as a precursor to further research funded by the Europe and Global Challenges Program and in Australia by CSIRO (see below).  Researchers in SLIM (with diverse disciplines, histories and contexts) did not seek to create a final synthesis of 'new knowledge' but devised a mediating heuristic which enabled different lineages of understanding to facilitate the bringing forth of differences that make a difference (to paraphrase Gregory Bateson).

 Phase 2: UK, China, South Africa and Australia – 2006-2021 

SLIM presaged an ongoing body of work concerned with social learning as process and governance mechanism in a range of river catchment settings including the UK, Australia54, South Africa, China and Western Europe.55 56 In a decadal review of this research in 2014 Ison and colleagues concluded that:57

"case studies, which originated from the SLIM Project, ... constitute inquiry pathways that are explored using a critical incident approach. The initial starting conditions for each inquiry pathway [were] compared; significant pathway dependencies [were] identified which foster the development of social learning processes locally, but constrain their uptake and embedding across the wider system.... in England & Wales, promising developments in the application of social learning approaches to river basin planning over an initial 3-year period were subsequently marginalised, only to resurface towards the end of the 10-year period of study. In the second, South African case study, significant spaces for social learning and innovation in integrated water resources management were opened up over a five year period but closed down again, primarily as the result of lack of policy support by national government. The third, Italian, case study was designed to assess options for adapting to climate change by opening up new learning spaces between researchers, stakeholders and policy makers. A case for investing in local level systemic innovation through social-learning praxis design approaches and in learning processes around well contextualised case-studies is supported. However, concomitant investment by policy makers in social learning as an alternative, but complementary, governance mechanism for systemic innovation for SD is needed."

Aware that participation, then social learning as processes could be designed and conducted effectively but were not being institutionalised, Ison turned his attention to the purposeful design of conducive contexts for enacting social learning. Following a partial relocation to Monash University (Melbourne, Australia from 2008-15) Ison created and led till 2015 the Systemic Governance Research Program (SGRP). From the Monash base his research expanded to look more closely at organisational and institutional constraints and possibilities for social learning with STiP in the Murray-Darling Basin Authority58, the Victorian Department of Primary Industries59, with the Victorian Climate Change Adaptation Research Program60 and in seeking to foster water sensitive cities in Australia.61

Ison's main contributions in this phase can be understood in terms of his developmental research into, and enactment of, a repertoire of STiP praxis forms.62 His research has contributed to: 

 refinement of	'systemic inquiry or co-inquiry' as a systemic practice	(building on earlier work by Churchman and Checkland) and its	framing as an institution suited for systemic governing by creating	a means of engaging with situations of uncertainty and complexity,	thus overcoming the limitations of the institution 'project'	which creates our 'projectified world' e.g. the Climate Change	Adaptation and Water Governance: Reconciling Food security,	Renewable Energy and the provision of multiple ecosystems services	(CADWAGO)	project;63	
 the design and	enactment of 'mediating' organisations and institutions better	able to operate between the arms of vertical and horizontal	governance in sustaining viable human-nature relations e.g. the	RESILIM-O Project concerned with 'governing' the Olifants River	catchment in South Africa, or the DFAT/CSIRO funded 'Learning	Project' as part of the Food System Innovation for Food Security	(FSIFS) initiative established in May 2012 to investigate the	effective application of science and evidence-based approaches to	the development, implementation and evaluation of food security	interventions with particular emphasis on the Australian Development	Assistance program, including in sub-Saharan Africa. 64	65	66	67
 conceptual-metaphor-theory-based	praxis though the use of metaphor	impact assessment	in public policy development (see doctoral research by McClintock68	and Helme69	and publications70	71	72);	
 social theories of	learning and the purposeful fostering of communities of practice73	
 institutional	analysis and redesign , especially regarding systemic affordances74	75	 and what Ison calls deframing, framing and reframing praxis as part	of systemic governance 76	77	 
 scenarioing praxis	within systemic governing 78;	
 systemic evaluation	as a key praxis within systemic governing 79;	

 being	transdisciplinary through STiP 80;	
 building synergies	between systemic governing and deliberative policy analysis81

1. Further curriculum renewal and STiP	capability developmentDevelopment began in 2008 of the first Systems PG (post-graduate) program at the Open University. The Masters program in Systems Thinking in Practice was launched in 2010 and has continued to run successfully since that time. About 1100 mature age students successfully completed the core modules (TU811 Thinking strategically: systems tools for managing change and TU812 Managing systemic change: inquiry, action and interaction) from 2010-2020.82 In 2020 these modules were replaced by TB871 Making strategy with systems thinking in practice and TB872 Managing change with systems thinking in practice.  Four purpose written books support this program (co-published with Springer) as do new animations and videos to support student learning. Taster material is available for free from OpenLearn.

From 2010 Ison has contributed to the activities of the Applied Systems Thinking in Practice (ASTiP) Group, including fostering an initiative to create a LEVEL 7 (Masters) Apprenticeship for the Systems Thinking Practitioner based on the UK (England) Apprenticeship Levy (2020). 

Ison, with colleagues Blackmore and Sriskandarajah, have developed an innovative Systemic Inquiry (SI) model for capability development in 'Systems Approaches to PhD Research' connected to conferences of the ISSS (International Society for the Systems Sciences) and the IFSA (European Division of the International Farming Systems Research Association). This initiative draws heavily on their 'teaching' scholarship drawing in experiences from Hawkesbury and the OU. By 2021 seven successful programs had been conducted (Denmark, 2 x Germany, UK, Austria, USA x2) with 140 participating PhD students. Based on these experiences Ison was invited in 2018 to design and conduct a summer school for 28 PhD students of the Chinese Academy of Sciences University, Beijing. This 'learning system' innovation is now designed into all ISSS and IFSA conferences.

As President of ISSS, the International Society for the Systems Sciences (2014-15), Ison organised and ran (with Louis Klein) a successful conference (250 participants), edited (with Monica Shelley) a special issue of Systems Research & Behavioural Science, gained funding for a unique event and delivered two keynote addresses under the aegis of 'Governing the Anthropocene'. Through collaboration with water governance researchers then at Humbolt University, Berlin (and a Visiting Professorship) Ison secured funding from the VWStiftung (c. €150k) to bring together 100 scholars plus 30 PhD students in systems, cybernetics and institutional economics from around the world in a novel 'systemic inquiry' held at Schloss Herrenhausen, Hannover. This was the first ever joint meeting of systems and institutional economics scholars and the first 'systemic inquiry' funded by the VWStiftung. A major report and web-resource were developed.

2. Expansion from	social learning to systemic governanceGovernance, or more strictly, governing, is a cybersystemic concept83 that involves operationalising feedback to take corrective action related to system purpose.  In 'The Hidden Power of Systems Thinking. Governance in a Climate Emergency' (with Ed Straw, March 2020) Ison achieves a synthesis of his research and OU experience of educating systems thinkers to address perhaps the most compelling issue of our times, viz. how to govern in a climate emergency. Their thesis is that we humans are maintaining a governance infrastructure with modes of thinking and practice that are no longer fit for purpose. Six of their 13 chapters are devoted to how to use systems thinking for governing in response to the Anthropocene. 

Ison argues that to govern effectively we must know what it is that we seek to govern i.e., to appreciate how best to frame our situation(s).  His work argues against most contemporary framing choices contending that it is not the Earth we seek to save nor a river catchment (or a social-ecological system etc) but a viable, healthy, ongoing co-evolutionary dynamic between humans and the biosphere in manifest, localised and situated ways.84 His research draws on work originally conceived, but not pursued, by Richard Norgaard in his 1994 book Development Betrayed: The End of Progress and a Coevolutionary Revisioning of the Future.Building research evidence for investing in systemic governanceMuch of Ison's research has been successfully applied and extended in a Victorian project to address the persistently failing governance of what in Australia is called 'NRM' (natural resources management). Originally funded by Charles Sturt University and the Helen Macpherson Smith Trust the project built a community of practice among a network of local, regional, state and federal natural resource managers and policy-makers who engaged in systemic co-inquiry, jointly generating a number of emergent themes worthy of on-going investigation. Each theme was given seed funding by DELWP and at least one has evolved into a self-organising autonomous organisation mediating relations between urban Victorians and their environment.85 Gardens for Wildlife Victoria is an outcome and an initiative that continues to grow throughout the State. 

 Leadership/Memberships of scientific societies 

2021+	Advisory Council Member, UK Cybernetic Society -

2018 + President of the International Federation for Systems Research (IFSR).

2017 + Member of the Scientific Council of the Bertalanffy Center for the Study of Systems Science (BCSSS); elected to Management Board of the BCSSS (2018).

2016 - 2018	Vice President, International Federation for Systems Research - http://www.ifsr.org/

2008 - 2018	Trustee, Chair of Trustees (from 2016), American Society of Cybernetics 

2013 - 2015	President Elect & President (2014-15) International Society for the Systems Sciences (ISSS) 

2011 +	Director, World Organisation of Systems and Cybernetics (WOSC).

 Commissions of trust 

2018 +	Director of the Systemic Change Lab of the European School of Governance, Berlin

2017	Reviewer of EPSRC Complexity Science Programs, Swindon, UK (April)

2014 + External Scientific Advisory Committee member, The Australian Prevention Partnership Centre (TAPPC), Sydney, Australia; a A$23 million NHMRC-funded Partnership Centre focusing on research on systems perspectives on the prevention of lifestyle-related chronic diseases.

2012 – 2020 International Reference Group member, US$8 million USAID-funded RESILIM Project on Water Governance in South Africa (Building improved transboundary governance and management of the Olifants Catchment of the Limpopo Basin for enhanced resiliency of its people and ecosystems to environmental change through systemic and participatory approaches).

2011	Member, Australian Water Culture Delegation to China (8 -15 October); Aust. - China Council, Dept., Foreign Affairs & Trade, Australia: Linking Australia and China: a "Bridge of Water Culture" project. 

2010	Member Expert Panel Reviewing the €22 million EU Sixth Framework SWITCH (Sustainable Water Management in the City of the Future) Project, Brussels (July).

2009 + Advisory Board, Centre for Resources, Energy & Environ. Law (CREEL), University of Melb.

2008 +	Adjunct Professor, Institute for Sustainable Futures, University of Technology, Sydney

2008 +	International member, Review of the National Urban Water Governance Program (NUWGP), School of Geography and Environmental Science, Monash University, Australia (October).

2007 - 2008	International Panel Member, Review of the Institute of Environmental Studies, University of NSW, Sydney, Australia.

2008 - 2018 Director, the Systemic Development Institute, Australia (with Richard Bawden and Roger Packham).

2000 -2006	Research Program Committee Member, WWF (UK) Ltd, Surrey UK

2000 - 2005	Management Board Member, The Natural Step (UK) Ltd.

2006 - 2008	Visiting Professor, Melbourne Water Research Centre (later Uniwater), University of Melbourne.

 Selected publications 
Books
 With Straw, Ed The Hidden Power of Systems Thinking. Routledge, 2020.Systems Practice: How to Act in a Climate Change World. Springer Science & Business Media, 2010.
With Russell, David. Agricultural extension and rural development: breaking out of knowledge transfer traditions. Cambridge University Press, 2007.
With Pearson, Craig J. Agronomy of grassland systems. Cambridge University Press, 1997.

Articles
Selected articles:
 With Ray, Niels Röling, and Drennan Watson. "Challenges to science and society in the sustainable management and use of water: investigating the role of social learning." Environmental Science & Policy 10.6 (2007): pp. 499–511.
 With Collins, Kevin. "Jumping off Arnstein's ladder: social learning as a new policy paradigm for climate change adaptation." Environmental Policy and Governance 19.6 (2009): pp. 358–373.
 With Russell, David  Fruits of Gregory Bateson's epistemological crisis: embodied mind-making and interactive experience in research and professional praxis. Canadian Journal of Communication, 42(3) (2017): pp. 485–514.

 References 

1�	Ison, RL (1982) Climatic factors controlling juvenility, flowering	and seed production in Stylosanthes guianesnsis var. guianensis.	PhD Thesis, University of Queensland

2�	Bawden, RJ (1992) Systems approaches to agricultural development:	The Hawkesbury experience. Agricultural Systems 40, 1–3, Pages	153-176.

3�	Bawden, R.J., Ison, R.L., Macadam, R.D., Packham, R.G.  &	Valentine, I. (1985). A research paradigm for systems	agriculture. In Farming Systems Research. Australian Expertise	for Third World Agriculture. Ed.  J.V.  Remenyi, ACIAR, Canberra. 	pp.  31-42.

4�	Bawden, R.J.  & Ison, R.L.  (1992) The purpose of field-crop	ecosystems: social and economic aspects. In Field-Crop Ecosystems.	  Ed.  C.J.  Pearson, Elsevier, Amsterdam.  pp. 11-35.

5�	Packham, R.G., Ison, R.L. & Roberts, R.J.  (1988).  	Soft-systems methodology for action research:  The role of a college	farm in an agricultural education institution. Agricultural	Administration & Extension, 30, 109-127.

6�	Ison, R.L. (2008) Systems thinking and practice for action research.	In Reason, P., & Bradbury, H. (eds.). The Sage Handbook of	Action Research Participative Inquiry and Practice (2nd edn).	Sage Publications: London, pp. 139-158.

7�	Potts, W.H.C. & Ison, R.L.  (1987). Australian Seed	Industry Study.  Occasional Publication No. 1, Grains Council of	Australia, Canberra.  Vol. 1.  239 pp. Vol. 2 (Appendices).  316 pp.

8�	Russell, D. (2011). Story-making and myth-making: the place of	poetic understanding when wrestling with real-world problems. In D.	Wright, C. E. Camden-Pratt, & S. B. Hill (Eds.), Social	Ecology: Applying Ecological Understandings to Our Lives and Our	Planet (pp. 134-137).

9�	Russell, D.B. & Ison, R.L. (2000) The research-development	relationship in rural communities:  an opportunity for contextual	science.  In Ison, R.L. & Russell, D.B. eds Agricultural	Extension and Rural Development: Breaking out of Traditions.	Cambridge University Press, Cambridge, UK. pp. 10-31.

10�	Russell, D.B., Ison, R.L., Gamble, D.R. & Williams, R.K. (1989)	A Critical Review of Rural Extension Theory and Practice. Australian	Wool Corporation/ University of Western Sydney (Hawkesbury). 67pp.	French Edition: (1991).  Analyse Critique de la Theorie et de la	Pratique de Vulgarisation Rurale en Australie.  INRA, France.  79pp.	Persian Edition: (1995).  The translation into Persian by Ahmad	Khatoonabadi.

11�	Russell, D.B. & Ison, R.L. (2000) Enthusiasm: developing	critical action for second-order R&D. In Ison, R.L. &	Russell, D.B. eds Agricultural Extension and Rural Development:	Breaking out of Traditions. Cambridge University Press, Cambridge,	UK. pp. 136-160.

12�	Russell, D.B. & Ison, R.L. (2000) Designing R&D systems for	mutual benefit.  In Ison, R.L. & Russell, D.B. eds Agricultural	Extension and Rural Development: Breaking out of Traditions.	Cambridge University Press, Cambridge, UK. pp. 208-218.

13�	Russell, D.B. & Ison, R.L. (2000) Enthusiasm: developing	critical action for second-order R&D. In Ison, R.L. &	Russell, D.B. eds Agricultural Extension and Rural Development:	Breaking out of Traditions. Cambridge University Press, Cambridge,	UK. pp. 136-160.

14�	Paschen, Jana-Axinja & Ison, R.L. (2014) Narrative research in	climate change adaptation – Exploring a complementary paradigm for	research and governance. Research Policy 43, 1083–1092.

15�	Webber, L (2000) C0-researching: briading theory and practice for	research with people. In Ison, R.L. & Russell, D.B. eds	Agricultural Extension and Rural Development: Breaking out of	Traditions. Cambridge University Press, Cambridge, UK. pp. 103-132.

16�	Kersten, S. & Ison, R.L. (1998) Listening, interpretative cycles	and dialogue: Process design for collaborative research and	development. The Journal of Agricultural Education & Extension	5, 163-178.

17�	Mackenzie, A. (2000) From theodolite to satellite: land technology	and power in the Western Division of NSW. In Ison, R.L. &	Russell, D.B. eds Agricultural Extension and Rural Development:	Breaking out of Traditions. Cambridge University Press, Cambridge,	UK. pp. 80-102.

18�	Ison, RL. (2000) Technology: transforming grazier experience. In	Ison, R.L. & Russell, D.B. eds Agricultural Extension and Rural	Development: Breaking out of Traditions. Cambridge University Press,	Cambridge, UK. pp. 52-76.

19�	Ison, RL. (2000) Experience, tradition and service?	Institutionalised R&D in the rangelands. In Ison, R.L. &	Russell, D.B. eds Agricultural Extension and Rural Development:	Breaking out of Traditions. Cambridge University Press, Cambridge,	UK. pp. 103-135.

20�	See also: Ison, R.L. & Russell, D.B. (2011) The worlds we	create: designing learning systems for the underworld of extension	practice. In Jennings, J., Packham, R.P. & Woodside, D. eds.	Shaping Change: Natural Resource Management, Agriculture and the	Role of Extension pp. 66-76. Australasia-Pacific Extension Network	(APEN), Australia and Russell, D.B & Ison, R.L. (2017) Fruits of	Gregory Bateson's epistemological crisis: embodied mind-making and	interactive experience in research and professional praxis Canadian	Journal of Communication 42 (3): 485–514.

21�	Russell, D.B.  & Ison R.L.  (1993) The research-development	relationship in rangelands: an opportunity for contextual science. 	Invited Plenary Paper, Proc. IVth International Rangeland Congress,	Montpellier, 1991. Vol. 3, pp. 1047 - 1054.

22�	Ison, R.L. (2019) Towards cyber-systemic thinking in practice. World	Futures 75 (1/2): 5-16.

23�	Fell. L. & Russell, DB (2000) The human quest for understanding	and agreement. In Ison, R.L. & Russell, D.B. eds Agricultural	Extension and Rural Development: Breaking out of Traditions.	Cambridge University Press, Cambridge, UK. pp. 32-51.

24�	Russell, D.B. & Ison, R.L. (2004) Maturana's intellectual	contribution as a choreography of conversation and action.	Cybernetics & Human Knowing, 11 (2) 36-48.

25�	Ison, RL (2017) Systems Practice: How to Act. In situations of	uncertainty and complexity in a climate-change world. 2nd Edition	Springer, London and The Open University.

26�	Ison, R.L.  (1993) Changing community attitudes. (Invited Keynote	Paper) The Rangeland Journal 15, 154-66

27�	Ison R.L. (1993) Participative ecodesign: a new paradigm for	professional practice.  Proc.  Epidemiology Chapter, Australian	Veterinary Association Annual Conference, Gold Coast.  pp. 41-50.

28�	Ison mounts similar arguments for 'behaviour change' research,	much of which is, he claims, ethically dubious.

29�	Ison, R.L.  & Ampt, P.R.  (1992) Rapid rural appraisal: a	participatory problem formulation method relevant to Australian	agriculture.  Agricultural Systems, 38, 363-386.

30�	Webber, L.M. & Ison, R.L.  (1995) Participatory rural appraisal	design: conceptual and process issues.  Agricultural Systems 47,	107-31.

31�	Armson, R., Ison, R. L., Short, L., Ramage, M. & Reynolds, M.	(2001) Rapid institutional appraisal (RIA): a systemic approach to	staff development.  Systems Practice & Action Research 14,	763-777.

32�	Ison, R.L. & Humphreys, L.R. (1984). Reproductive physiology of	Stylosanthes.  In The Biology and Agronomy of Stylosanthes. 	Eds.  H.M. Stace & L.A.  Edye.  Academic Press, Sydney.  pp. 	257-77.

33�	Blumenthal, M.J. & Ison, R.L. (1996) Plant population dynamics	in subterranean clover and murex medic swards. III. The effect of	pod burial, summer grazing and autumn cultivation on emergence. 	Australian Journal of Experimental Agriculture 36, 533-538.

34�	Jansen, P.I., Ison, R.L & Cousens, R.  (1996) Population	dynamics of Trifolium balansae and T. resupinatum in	self-regenerating pastures. II. Predicting long term persistence	from a demographic model.  Journal of Applied Ecology 33, 1251-56.

35�	Pearson, C.J.  & Ison, R.L. (1992) University education for	multiple-goal agriculture in Australia.  Agricultural Systems, 38,	341-362.

36�	Ison, R.L. (2016) Governing in the Anthropocene: what future systems	thinking in practice? Systems Research & Behavioral Science 33	(5): 595-613.

37�	Ison, R.L., Blackmore, C.P., Collins, K.B. & Furniss, P. (2007)	Systemic environmental decision making: designing learning systems.	Kybernetes 36, (9/10) 1340-1361.

38�	Ison, R.L. (2001) Systems practice at the United Kingdom's Open	University.  In J. Wilby & G. Ragsdell eds. Understanding	Complexity. pp. 45-54.  Kluwer Academic/Plenum Publishers.

39�	Ison, R.L. (2000) Supported open learning and the emergence of	learning communities. The case of the Open University UK. In R.	Miller, ed. Creating Learning Communities. Models, Resources, and	New Ways of Thinking about Teaching and Learning, pp. 90-96. Solomon	Press, Brandon VT.

40�	Maiteny, P.T. & Ison, R.L. (2000) Appreciating systems: critical	reflections on the changing nature of systems as a discipline in a	systems learning society.  Systems Practice & Action Research 16	(4) 559-586.

41�	From 1995 Ison's research increasingly took on an institutional	turn guided by developments in institutional	economics and his experiences of systemic failure brought about	by institutions no longer relevant to the circumstances in which	they operated – this institutional turn in most marked in the SLIM	research program which he led from 2000-2004.

42�	Ison, R.L. (1994) Designing learning systems: How can systems	approaches be applied in the training of research workers and	development actors? Proceedings International Symposium on	Systems-oriented Research in Agriculture and Rural Development Vol.	2. Lectures and Debates. pp. 369-394. CIRAD-SAR, Montpellier.

43�	Ison, R.L. & Russell, D.B. (2000) Exploring some	distinctions for the design of learning systems. Cybernetics and	Human Knowing'', 7 (4) 43-56.

44�	Ison, R.L. (2002) Systems practice and the design of learning	systems: orchestrating an ecological conversation.  Proc. An	Interdisciplinary Dialogue: Agricultural Production and Integrated	Ecosystem Management of Soil and Water' Ballina, NSW, Australia	12-16 November 2002.

45�	Christine Blackmore (2009) Learning systems and communities of	practice for environmental decision making. PhD Thesis, The Open	University (UK).

46�	Chris High (2002) Opening up spaces for learning: A systems approach	to sustainable development. PhD Thesis, The Open University

47�	Alexandra di Stefano (2000) Beyond the rhetoric: a grounded theory	perspective on learning company and learning community relationships	PhD Thesis, The Open University

48�	Blackmore, C.P. & Ison, R.L. (2012) Designing and developing	learning systems for managing systemic change in a climate change	world. In Wals, A. & Corcoran P.B., eds. Learning for	sustainability in times of accelerating change. pp. 347-364. 	Wageningen Academic Publishers, Education and Sustainable	Development Series, Wageningen, The Netherlands.

49�	LEARN. eds. (2000) Cow up a Tree. Knowing and Learning for Change in	Agriculture. Case Studies from Industrialised Countries.  INRA	(Institut National de la Recherche Agronomique) Editions, Paris. pp.	443-458.

50�	Hubert, B., Avelange, I., Proost, M.D.C, Ison, R.L., Blackmore, C.	(2005) LEARNing in European Agricultural and Rural Networks:	institutions, networks and governance. Final Report. Contract no.	HPSE-CT-2002-60059, EU.

51�	Blackmore, Chris (2007) What kinds of knowledge, knowing and	learning are required for addressing resource dilemmas?: a	theoretical overview. Environmental Science & Policy 10 (6):	512-525.

52�	Ison, R.L. (2005) Traditions of understanding: language, dialogue	and experience. In Meg Keen, Valerie A. Brown & Rob Dyball	(eds), Social Learning in Environmental Management. Towards a	Sustainable Future, pp. 22-40. Earthscan: London.

53�	Steyaert, Patrick, and Janice Jiggins. (2007) "Governance of complex	environmental situations through social learning: a synthesis of SLIM's lessons for research, policy and practice."	Environmental Science & Policy 10 (6): 575-586.

54�	Wallis, P., Ison, R.L. and Samson, K. (2013) Identifying the	conditions for social learning in water governance in regional	Australia.  Land Use Policy 31, 412-421.

55�	Collins, K.B., Colvin, J. & Ison, R.L. (2009) Building 'learning	catchments' for integrated catchment managing: designing learning	systems and networks based on experiences in the UK, South Africa	and Australia. Water Science & Technology 59, (4) 687-693.

56�	Collins, K.B. & Ison, R.L. (2009) Jumping off Arnstein's	ladder: social learning as a new policy paradigm for climate change	adaptation. Environmental Policy & Governance 19 (6) 358-373.

57�	Colvin, J., Blackmore, C., Chimbuya, S., Collins, K.B., Dent, M.,	Goss, J., Ison, R.L., Roggero, P.P. & Seddaiu, G. (2014) In	search of systemic innovation for sustainable development: a design	praxis emerging from a decade of social learning inquiry Research	Policy 43, 760–771.

58�	Ison, R.L. & Wallis, P. (2011) Planning as Performance. The	Murray-Darling Basin Plan. In Grafton Q & Connell, D. eds. Basin	Futures: Water reform in the Murray-Darling Basin, pp. 399-411. ANU	ePress, Canberra

59�	Grant, A., Ison, R.L., Faggian, R. & Sposito, V. (2018)	Introducing systems approaches for climate change adaptation	research within an agricultural bureaucracy: a systemic inquiry	Systemic Practice and Action Research, 32 (5): 573–600.	

60�	Paschen, Jana-Axinja & Ison, R.L. (2013) Exploring local	narratives of environmental change and adaptation. A report from the	VCCCAR Project: 'Framing multi-level and multi-actor adaptation	responses in the Victorian context'	http://www.vcccar.org.au/publication/research-paper/exploring-local-narratives-environmental-change-and-adaptation	().

61�	Ison, R.L., Collins, K.B., Bos, J.J. & Iaquinto, B. (2009)	Transitioning to Water Sensitive Cities in Australia: A summary of	the key findings, issues and actions arising from five national	capacity building and leadership workshops. NUWGP/IWC, Monash	University, Clayton.

62�	Ison, R.L., Collins, K.B, Colvin, J.C, Jiggins, J. Roggero, P.P.,	Seddaiu, G., Steyaert, P., Toderi, M. and Zanolla, C. (2011)	Sustainable catchment managing in a climate changing world: new	integrative modalities for connecting policy makers, scientists and	other stakeholders, Water Resources Management 25 (15) 3977-3992

63�	Foster, N. Collins, K.B., Ison, R.L., & Blackmore, C.P.  (2016)	Water governance in England: Improving understandings and practices	through systemic co-inquiry Water 8, 540; 

64�	Hall, Andy, Peter Carberry, Appolinaire Djikeng, Harold	Roy-Macauley, Bruce Pengelly, Aboubakar Njoya, Leah Ndungu, Issoufou	Kollo, Caroline Bruce, Larelle McMillan, Ray Ison & Brian	Keating (2016) The Journey to R4D: An institutional history of an	Australian Initiative on Food Security in Africa. In Francis, J.,	Mytelka, L., van Huis, A. and Röling, N. (eds.). Innovation	Systems: Towards Effective Strategies in support of Smallholder	Farmers. pp. 183-201. Technical Centre for Agricultural and Rural	Cooperation (CTA) and Wageningen University and Research	(WUR)/Convergence of Sciences-Strengthening Innovation Systems	(CoS-SIS), Wageningen.

65�	Ison, R.L., Carberry, P., Davies, J., Hall, A., McMillan, L., Maru,	Y., Pengelly, B., Reichelt, N., Stirzaker, R., Wallis, P., Watson,	I., Webb, S. (2014) Programs, projects and learning inquiries:	institutional mediation of innovation in research for development,	Outlook on Agriculture 43(3), 165-172.

66�	Reichelt, N.T., Wallis, P.J., Ison, R.L., Davies, J., Carberry, P.,	Sparrow, A., Hall, A., Maru, Y. (2016) Mediating boundaries between	knowledge and knowing: ICT and R4D praxis, Outlook on Agriculture 45	(4): 238–245.

67�	Maru, Y.T., James R.A.  Butler, Andy Hall, Ashley Sparrow, Onil	Banerjee, Ray Ison & Peter Carberry (2018) Towards appropriate	mainstreaming of 'Theory of Change' approaches into agricultural	research for development: challenges and opportunities. Agricultural	Systems, 165, 344-353.

68�	David McClintock (1996) Metaphors that inspire 'researching with	people': UK farming, countrysides and diverse stakeholder contexts.	PhD Thesis, The Open University UK.

69�	Marion Helme (2002) Appreciating metaphor for participatory	practice: constructivist inquiries in a children and young people's	justice organisation. PhD Thesis, The Open University, UK.

70�	McClintock, D., Ison, R.L. & Armson, R.  (2003) Metaphors of	research and researching with people. Journal of Environmental	Planning and Management, 46, (5) 715-731.

71�	Ison, R.L., Allan, C. & Collins, K.B. (2015) Reframing water	governance praxis: does reflection on metaphors have a role?	Environment & Planning C: Government & Policy 33, 1697 –	1713

72�	McClintock, D., Ison, R.L. & Armson, R.  (2004) Conceptual	metaphors: a review with implications for human understandings and	systems practice. Cybernetics and Human Knowing 11, (1) 25-47.

73�	Ison, R.L., Blackmore, C.P., Collins, K., Holwell, S., &	Iaquinto, B. (2013) Insights into operationalizing communities of	practice from SSM-based inquiry processes. Systemic Practice &	Action Research 27, 91-113

74�	Wallis, P. & Ison, R.L. (2011) Appreciating institutional	complexity in water governance dynamics: a case from the	Murray-Darling Basin, Australia, Water Resources Management 25 (15)	4081-4097.

75�	Ison, R.L. (2016) What is systemic about innovation systems? The	implications for policies, governance and institutionalisation. In	Francis, J., Mytelka, L., van Huis, A. and Röling, N. (eds.)	Innovation Systems: Towards Effective Strategies in support of	Smallholder Farmers, pp. 37-52. Technical Centre for Agricultural	and Rural Cooperation (CTA) and Wageningen University and Research	(WUR)/Convergence of Sciences-Strengthening Innovation Systems	(CoS-SIS), Wageningen.

76�	Wei, Y.P., Ison, R.L., Colvin, J.D. & Collins, K. (2011)	Reframing water governance in China: a multi-perspective study of an	over-engineered catchment.  Journal of Environmental Planning &	Management 55 (3) 297-318.

77�	Ison, R.L. & Straw, E. (2020) The Hidden Power of Systems	Thinking – Governance in a Climate Emergency. Routledge, Abingdon.

78�	Ison, R.L., Grant, A., & Bawden, R.B. (2014) Scenario praxis for	systemic and adaptive governance: A critical framework Environment &	Planning C: Government & Policy 32(4), 623 – 640.

79�	Schmidt-Abbey, B., Reynolds, M. & Ison, R.L. (2020) Towards	systemic evaluation in turbulent times – making a second-order	practice shift. Evaluation 26 (2) 205–226.

80�	Ison, R.L. (2017) Transdisciplinarity as transformation: a systems	thinking in practice perspective, In Fam, D., Palmer, J., Mitchell,	C., & Riedy, C. eds. Transdisciplinary Research and Practice for	Sustainable Outcomes, pp. 55-73. Routledge, London.

81�	Foster, N., Ison, R.L., Blackmore, C.P., & Collins, K.B. (2019)	Revisiting deliberative policy analysis through systemic co-inquiry:	some experiences from the implementation of the Water Framework	Directive in England, Policy Studies 40, 510-533.

82�	Ison, R.L. & Blackmore, C. (2014) Designing and developing a	reflexive learning system for managing systemic change. Systems	Education for a Sustainable Planet Special Issue, Systems, 2(2),	119-136.

83�	Ison, R.L. (2011) Cybersystemic conviviality: addressing the	conundrum of ecosystems services. ASC (American Society for	Cybernetics) Column, Cybernetics & Human Knowing 18 (1, 2),	135-141.

84�	Ison, R.L., Alexandra, J. & Wallis, P.J (2018) Governing in the	Anthropocene: are there cyber-systemic antidotes to the malaise of	modern governance? Sustainability Science 13, (5): 1209–1223.

85�	Mumaw, Laura, Ison, Ray, Corney, Helen, Gaskell, Nadine, Kelly,	Irene (2020) Reframing and enacting biodiversity conservation as	human-nature relations through systemic co-inquiry Journal of	Environmental Policy & Planning (submitted)

External links 
 Ray Ison, at Open University
 Systemic musings, blog by Ray Ison

1950s births
Living people
Environmental scientists
Systems scientists
University of Sydney alumni
University of Queensland alumni
Academics of the Open University
Academic staff of Monash University
Presidents of the International Society for the Systems Sciences